The Franklin & Marshall Diplomats football program is a college football team that represents Franklin & Marshall College in the Centennial Conference, a part of the NCAA Division III.  The team has had 39 head coaches since its first recorded football game in 1887.  The current coach is Tom Blumenauer who first took the position for the 2022 season.

Among the coaches for the program include Hall of Fame coach John H. Outland, namesake of the Outland Trophy.

Key

Coaches
Statistics correct as of the end of the 2022 college football season.

Notes

References

Lists of college football head coaches

Pennsylvania sports-related lists